Dhadkane Azad Hain is the first ever Hindustani Classic independent single produced by Shreya Ghoshal. The Song is Composed by Deepak Pandit and Lyrics have been penned by Manoj Muntashir.

Development
The singer always wanted to make independent music that does not have the boundaries or restrictions that a movie has so she geared up for the Single.

Shooting
The music video features Shreya Ghoshal herself in the valley of Manali, Himachal Pradesh directed by Parasher Baruah.

Release
The official teaser of the Single was released on 2 July 2017 on the official YouTube of Shreya Ghoshal.
The full video song was released on 10 July 2017 on the same. It frequently gained the attention of public and counted 140k views on the second day.

Personnel
As listed by the official YouTube channel of Shreya Ghoshal.

Music Composer and Arranger - Deepak Pandit
Lyrics - Manoj Muntashir
Song Programming and Guitars - Sanjay Jaipurewale
Tabla and Dholak - Heera Pandit
Esraj- Arshad Khan
Live Strings - Bombay String Section
Song Recording and Mixing Engineer - K. Sethuraman at Keerthana Studio
Vocals Recorder - Amey Londhe, Audio Garage Studio
Mastering Engineer - Christian Wright at Abbey Road Studio, London

Reviews

See also

References

External links
iTunes
Saavn
Gaana
 Google Play
Ok Listen

Shreya Ghoshal songs
2017 songs
2017 singles
Songs with lyrics by Manoj Muntashir